St. Edmund's Church or similar variations can refer to numerous churches:

Norway 
 St. Edmund's Church, Oslo

United Kingdom 
 Catholic Church of St Oswald and St Edmund Arrowsmith, Lancashire
 Church of St Edmund, Acle, Norfolk
 Church of St Edmund, Dudley, West Midlands
 Church of St Edmund, Hardingstone, Northamptonshire
 Church of St Edmund King and Martyr, Kellington, North Yorkshire
 Church of St Edmund, Mansfield Woodhouse, Nottinghamshire
 Church of St Edmund, Taverham, Norfolk
 Church of the Holy Trinity with St Edmund, Bristol
 St Edmund Church, Godalming, Surrey
 St Edmund of Canterbury, Whitton, London (Catholic)
 St Edmund's Chapel, Dover
 St Edmund's Church, Bury St Edmunds, Suffolk
 St Edmund's Church, Holme Pierrepont, Nottinghamshire
 St Edmund's Church, Norwich, Norfolk
 St Edmund's Church, Rochdale, Greater Manchester
 St Edmund's Church, Southampton, Hampshire
 St Edmund's Church, Southwold, Suffolk
 St Edmund's Church, Walesby, Nottinghamshire
 St Edmund's Church, Wootton, Isle of Wight
 St Edmund, King and Martyr, City of London
 St Edmund's Church, Castleton, Derbyshire
 St Edmund's Church, Fenny Bentley, Derbyshire
 Church of St Edmund, Sedgefield, County Durham
 St Edmund's Church, Crickhowell, Powys, Wales
 St Edmund's Church, Forest Gate, London
 Our Lady and St Edmund's Church, Abingdon, Oxfordshire.

United States 
 St. Edmund's Anglican Church, Elm Grove, Wisconsin

See also 
 Saint Edmund (disambiguation)